Abralia heminuchalis is a species of enoploteuthid cephalopod native to the equatorial regions of the Pacific Ocean. It may be a junior synonym of A. siedleckyi. Females are larger (28–37 mm mantle length) than males (25–32 mm mantle length). Oocytes in mature females can reach 1.25 mm in length. Male spermatophores are relatively small at 3.6–4.0 mm in length.

References

Abralia
Molluscs described in 1992